E. "Red" Hale is an American former Negro league shortstop who played in the 1930s.

Hale made his Negro leagues debut in 1937 with the Detroit Stars and played for the Chicago American Giants in 1939. In 28 recorded career games, he posted 25 hits with three home runs in 108 plate appearances.

References

External links
 and Seamheads

Year of birth missing
Place of birth missing
Chicago American Giants players
Detroit Stars (1937) players